Qanli Bolagh (also Romanized as Qānlī Bolāgh and Qānlū Bolāgh) is a village in Eypak Rural District in the Central District of Eshtehard County, Alborz province, Iran. At the 2006 census, its population was 149, in 29 families.

References 

Populated places in Eshtehard County